The Magistrale for Europe (German: Magistrale für Europa; French: Magistrale européenne) or Main line for Europe is a Trans-European Transport Networks (TEN-T) project for the creation of a high-speed railway line between Paris and Bratislava, with a branch-off to Budapest. It was listed as TEN project No. 17 (Paris—Bratislava) by the European Commission in 1995, and is already under way.

The project is planned to be completed by 2020. It will link 34 million people in five European countries.

Sections 
Parts of the route were formerly served by Orient Express trains, which ceased operations in 2009. Today TGV rail connections exist from Paris to Stuttgart or at longest Munich. The Austrian Federal Railways (ÖBB) currently provide direct Railjet and EuroNight connections between Munich and Budapest.

France 

The French part of the line is the LGV Est européenne high-speed railway. Its first section as far as Baudrecourt east of Metz has been in use since 2007 whilst the second section to Vendenheim near Strasbourg opened in July 2016.

Germany 
In Germany, the line follows the Appenweier–Strasbourg railway (Europabahn) from the Rhine Bridge to Appenweier and then the Mannheim–Karlsruhe–Basel railway (Rheintalbahn) down to Bruchsal. The second part of the new Rheintalbahn (Rastatt Süd to Bruchsal) is to be completed by 2014. Stuttgart Hauptbahnhof is currently being rebuilt (scheduled for completion in 2025) as a through station in the course of the controversial Stuttgart 21 project. Despite some protests, a 2011 statewide referendum upheld the majority support and thus the political decision to rebuild the station and let the Magistrale for Europe project proceed.

The Munich–Augsburg railway is being upgraded to separate slower traffic (freight and short-distance trains) from high speed trains, which will be able to reach . From München-Pasing station trains may run directly to München Ost without passing München Hauptbahnhof. Plans for the reconstruction of the Munich main station similar to Stuttgart 21 have been abandoned.

In Freilassing the MoE joins the Rosenheim–Salzburg railway leading across the Austrian border including a new third track serving the Salzburg S-Bahn commuter network.

Austria 

In Austria, the Western Railway line is to be extended to reduce travel time between Munich, Salzburg, Linz, and Vienna to one hour each.

In Vienna, the former Südbahnhof terminal station was demolished and replaced by new Wien Hauptbahnhof. From here, trains run on the Eastern Railway line to Bratislava-Petržalka railway station, including a connection to Vienna International Airport. East of Vienna, a southwestern branch-off leads via Győr to Budapest.

Route 

1 It is calculated with the fastest possible durations between the towns.
2 Real duration is longer due to changing.

Source: annual report 2006/07 of Péter Balázs

See also

 High-speed rail in France
 High-speed rail in Germany
 High-speed rail in Italy

References

External links 
Main Line for Europe

High-speed railway lines
High-speed rail in Europe